Canistrum pickelii is a species of flowering plant in the genus Canistrum. This species is endemic to Brazil.

References

pickelii
Flora of Brazil